General Eva Evelyn Burrows, AC, OF (15 September 192920 March 2015) was an Australian Salvation Army Officer and was, from 1986 to 1993, the 13th General of the Salvation Army. She served as an Officer of the Salvation Army from 1951 to her retirement in 1993. In 1993 Henry Gariepy released her biography, General of God's Army the Authorized Biography of General Eva Burrows.

Early life
Burrows was born on 15 September 1929 in Newcastle. Her parents, Robert John Guthrie Burrows and Ella Maria Watson Burrows, were both Salvation Army Officers. The couple had nine children: Dorothy, Joyce, Beverly, Walter, Robert, Bramwell, Elizabeth, Eva and Margaret. With her parents' itinerant life-style Burrows primary schooling was interrupted, she completed her secondary education at Brisbane State High School, where she was selected as a prefect and Head Girl. From the age of seventeen, Burrows attended the University of Queensland and received her Bachelor of Arts in May 1950 with majors in English and History.

Salvation Army
In 1950 Burrows entered The Salvation Army's International Training College in London. She was commissioned as a Salvation Army Officer in 1951. After studying at London University to be a teacher she served at the Howard Institute in Rhodesia from 1952 to 1967, was Principal of the Usher Institute from 1966 to 1970, and served at the International College for Officers, at The Cedars, Sydenham Hill London, from 1970 to 1975, first as Assistant Principal, then as Principal.

She became the leader of the Salvation Army's Social Services for Women in Great Britain in 1975, and leader of the Salvation Army's work in Sri Lanka in 1977.  In 1980 she became leader of the Salvation Army's work in Scotland, followed in 1982 as leader of the Salvation Army's work in the Australian Southern Territory. In 1986 she was elected General of the Salvation Army by the slimmest margin in the history of the High Council (22 to 24 on the fourth ballot, a margin of one person's vote). In 1986, at 56, General Burrows became the organization’s youngest commander. The Australian-born Eva Burrows was the only woman candidate of seven and was elected by the army’s high council to replace the retiring General  Jarl Wahlström. During her seven years as the leader of the Salvation Army she proved highly effective, directing operations in some 90 countries and reawakening the Army’s founding spirit of evangelism by leading it back into Eastern Europe after the fall of communism. At the end of her term as General, she was extended a further two years because of her excellent record and achievements.

Burrows continued active salvation warfare, having completed a ten-year post on the Board of the International Bible Society (in 2005), and being the international Champion of the Be A Hero campaign, as well as sitting on the Board of Reference of The Salvation Army War College. She wrote A Field For Exploits: Training Leaders For The Salvation Army.

Death
Burrows died aged 85 on 20 March 2015 at the Coppin Centre in Melbourne, Victoria. She was surrounded by loved ones on the day she passed, and two African nurses who were working there sang the Zimbabwe national anthem with her. A third nurse tending to her was from Usher, a school she had been principal of in then-Rhodesia.

Honours
In the Australia Day Honours of 1986 Burrows was appointed an Officer of the Order of Australia (AO) with the citation "In recognition of service to the temporal and spiritual welfare of the community and to social justice as the world leader of the Salvation Army". In 1994 it was upgraded to Companion of the Order of Australia (AC).

In 1988 she became an Honorary Doctor of Liberal Arts at Ewha Womans University in Seoul, and was awarded an Honorary LLD from Asbury University in the USA in 1988. In December 1993, she received an honorary Doctor of Philosophy from her alma mater, the University of Queensland.

On 1 January 2001 Burrows received a Centenary Medal "[f]or service to the Australian community". In the same year she was also inducted to the Victorian Honour Roll of Women.

Burrows was inducted into the Queensland Business Leaders Hall of Fame in 2012.

On Friday 3 July 2015 (AEST), just three months after her death, General Eva Burrows was awarded the highest honour of the Salvation Army posthumously, the "Order of the Founder" in a ceremony at Boundless, in London which celebrated 150 years of the Salvation Army. The award was received by Commissioner Tidd on behalf of the Burrows family.

Appointments and qualifications

References

General
 
Specific

External links
 Biography and Interview from Australian Biography Online
 General Eva Burrows, biography at Women's International Center
 "Why Help the Poor?"  – A condensed version of an address delivered by General Burrows at the opening session of the Third Asia-Pacific Regional Workshop on Banking with the Poor held in Brisbane 21–25 November 1995.
 
 "Celebrating General Eva Burrows" 
 "General Eva Burrows remembered as inspirational servant of God"
 "Live stream of service celebrating the life of General Eva Burrows"
 "General Eva Burrows Obituary"

1929 births
2015 deaths
Alumni of the University of London
Australian Salvationists
Companions of the Order of Australia
Recipients of the Centenary Medal
People from Brisbane
Salvation Army officers
People educated at Brisbane State High School